Ljubo Vukić (born 3 August 1982) is a Croatian handball player. Born in Split, he was a member of the Croatia men's national handball team at the 2008 Summer Olympics in Beijing, China.

References 

1982 births
Living people
Croatian male handball players
Olympic handball players of Croatia
Handball players at the 2008 Summer Olympics
Sportspeople from Split, Croatia
RK Medveščak Zagreb players
RK Zagreb players
Mediterranean Games silver medalists for Croatia
Competitors at the 2005 Mediterranean Games
Mediterranean Games medalists in handball